Filipo Muller (born 17 January 1986) is a Tongan sprinter. He competed in the men's 100 metres at the 2004 Summer Olympics.

References

External links
 

1986 births
Living people
Athletes (track and field) at the 2004 Summer Olympics
Tongan male sprinters
Olympic athletes of Tonga
Place of birth missing (living people)
21st-century Tongan people